Nassarius fissilabris is a species of sea snail, a marine gastropod mollusc in the family Nassariidae, the Nassa mud snails or dog whelks.

Description
The shell size varies between 10 mm and 20 mm

Distribution
This species is distributed in the Red Sea and along Oman.

References

 Vine, P. (1986). Red Sea Invertebrates. Immel Publishing, London. 224 pp.

External links
 Gastropods.com : Nassarius (Plicarcularia) fissilabrus; accessed : 31 December 2010

Nassariidae
Gastropods described in 1852